Alexander Alekseyevich Shalimov (January 20, 1918 – February 28, 2006) was a Soviet and Ukrainian surgeon and one of the founders of the Shalimov National Institute of Surgery and Transplantation, which is named after him.

Life 
Alexander Shalimov was one of 11 children in a farmers family, which moved to Kuban (Koshekhabl) in 1925, where he attended school. From 1934 to 1936 he attended the Medical school of Kuban, which he graduated with honors. He then attended the Kuban State Medical University in Krasnodar, which he completed in 1941. In September 1944 he became the chief physician and head of the surgical department of the city Baikal City Hospital in Petrovsk-Zabaykalsky. Since 1959 he held the Chair of Thoracic Surgery and Anesthesiology at the Kharkiv National Medical University. Starting in May 1970 he held the Chair of Surgery at the Kyiv Institute of Continuing Education. Since May 1971 he was the Director of the Research Institute of Hematology and Blood Transfusion. After July 1972 he was the director and after April 1988 the Honorary Director of the Research Institute for Clinical and Experimental Surgery. At the same time he was a chief surgeon of the Ukrainian Ministry of Healthcare.

Shalimov was a member of the National Academy of Sciences of Ukraine since 1978 and of the Ukrainian Medical Academy since 1993. He performed around 40-thousand operations, authored over 830 medical publications, including 30 monographs. He is further credited with 112 inventions.

He died in 2006 in Kyiv and was buried in the Baikove Cemetery. In 2014 a monument was erected in his honor in Kyiv.

Honors 
Alexander Shalimov received numerous orders and honors.

 1956 Honorary doctorate from the RSFSR
 1967 Accomplished scientist
 1977, 1985 State prize of the USSR
 Order of the October Revolution
 Order of the Red Banner of Labour
 1982 Hero of Socialist Labour
 1982 Order of Lenin
 1985 USSR State Prize
 1988 Honorary Director of the Kyiv Institute of Clinical and Experimental Surgery
 1993 Ukrainian Order of Merit 3rd class
 1998 Honorary citizen of the city of Kyiv
 1999 Ukrainian Order of Merit 1st class
 2001 Honorary citizen of Kharkiv
 2005 Hero of Ukraine
 2014 Monument in Kyiv
 2018 On his 100th birthday the National Bank of Ukraine issued a two-hryvnia commemorative coin with his portrait within the series of coins Outstanding Personalities of Ukraine

1918 births
2006 deaths
People from Zadonsky District
20th-century physicians
Members of the National Academy of Sciences of Ukraine
Heroes of Socialist Labour
Recipients of the Order of Lenin
Recipients of the Order of Merit (Ukraine), 1st class
Recipients of the Order of Merit (Ukraine), 2nd class
Recipients of the Order of the Red Banner of Labour
Recipients of the title of Hero of Ukraine
Recipients of the USSR State Prize
Ukrainian surgeons
Soviet surgeons
Burials at Baikove Cemetery